T-cell acute lymphocytic leukemia 2, also known as TAL2, is a protein which in humans is encoded by the TAL2 gene.

Function 
TAL2 is a member of the basic helix-loop-helix family of transcription factors.

Clinical significance 
Tumor-specific alterations of the TAL2 gene occurs in some patients with T-cell acute lymphoblastic leukemia (T-ALL).

References

Further reading